Kouassi Kouassi (born 13 November 1966) is an Ivorian boxer. He competed in the men's light welterweight event at the 1988 Summer Olympics.

References

1966 births
Living people
Ivorian male boxers
Olympic boxers of Ivory Coast
Boxers at the 1988 Summer Olympics
Place of birth missing (living people)
Light-welterweight boxers